Jean Sutherland (1907-2006) was a writer, performer and photographer, who lived for most of her life in the village of Newburgh, in Fife, Scotland.

Her photographs of Fife locals and events appeared from the early 1960s to the 1990s in the Fife Herald and The Courier, for whom she contributed articles on the history of Newburgh.

A lifelong collector and performer of poems and songs, she performed from the 1960s with The Fife Yokels, recording a number of LPs and appearing on Grampian Television's Bothy Nichts programmes. Sutherland wrote a number of original songs, including "Among The Neeps" and "The Barley".

References

1907 births
Scottish songwriters
Scottish artists
Scottish photographers
2006 deaths
Scottish women artists
Scottish women photographers